Elizabeth Rose Keddell (born 31 January 1994) is a New Zealand field hockey player. She has competed for the New Zealand women's national field hockey team (the Black Sticks Women) since 2012, including at the 2014 Women's Hockey World Cup and the 2014 Commonwealth Games.

Life 
Keddell was born in Tauranga and attended Bethlehem College. She is a first cousin to Olympic  sprinter Mark Keddell and Olympic gold medallist rower Mahé Drysdale.

She competed in the 2010 Summer Youth Olympics as part of the New Zealand girls' hockey team where she won a bronze medal. She was selected for the Black Sticks in November 2012 and played her first match against India in Napier on 8 December 2012.
She participated at the 2020 Women's FIH Pro League.

References

External links
 

1994 births
Living people
Sportspeople from Tauranga
New Zealand female field hockey players
Field hockey players at the 2014 Commonwealth Games
Commonwealth Games bronze medallists for New Zealand
Field hockey players at the 2010 Summer Youth Olympics
Field hockey players at the 2016 Summer Olympics
Olympic field hockey players of New Zealand
Commonwealth Games medallists in field hockey
Female field hockey defenders
Female field hockey midfielders
Commonwealth Games gold medallists for New Zealand
Field hockey players at the 2018 Commonwealth Games
Field hockey players at the 2020 Summer Olympics
20th-century New Zealand women
21st-century New Zealand women
Medallists at the 2014 Commonwealth Games
Medallists at the 2018 Commonwealth Games